Albategnius is an ancient lunar impact crater located in the central highlands. It is named after the Mesopotamian Muslim astronomer and scientist Abū ʿAbd Allāh Muḥammad ibn Jābir ibn Sinān al-Raqqī al-Ḥarrānī aṣ-Ṣābiʾ al-Battānī, Latinized as Albategnius.

Description

The level interior of Albategnius forms a walled plain, surrounded by the high, terraced rim. The outer wall is somewhat hexagon-shaped, and has been heavily eroded with impacts, valleys, and landslips. It attains a height above 4,000 metres along the northeast face. The rim is broken in the southwest by the smaller crater Klein.

Offset to the west of the crater's midpoint is its central peak, designated Alpha (α) Albategnius. It is longest in extent in the north–south direction, extending for just under 20 kilometres, and has a width about half that. The peak rises to an altitude of roughly 1.5 km, and a tiny, relatively fresh crater is at the top.

Location

Albategnius is located to the south of the crater Hipparchus and to the east of both Ptolemaeus and Alphonsus. The surface in this area is marked by a set of nearly parallel scars that form channels running roughly in a north–south line, bent slightly to the southeast.

Observations
Albategnius is believed to have been featured prominently in an early sketch drawing by Galileo in his book Sidereus Nuncius (1610), appearing along the lunar terminator.

Names
Albategnius is named after Mesopotamian Arab astronomer Al-Battani. Like many of the craters on the Moon's near side, it was given its name by Giovanni Riccioli, whose 1651 nomenclature system has become standardized. Earlier lunar cartographers had given the feature different names. Michael van Langren's 1645 map calls it "Ferdinandi III Imp. Rom." after Ferdinand III, the Holy Roman Emperor. Johannes Hevelius called it "Didymus Mons".

Satellite craters

By convention these features are identified on lunar maps by placing the letter on the side of the crater midpoint that is closest to Albategnius.

See also
 Thebit (crater)

References

Bibliography

External links

 LTO-77C1 Albategnius — L&PI topographic map
Albategnius at The Moon Wiki 
 
 
 

Impact craters on the Moon